Amoni is a village in the Bhopal district of Madhya Pradesh, India. It is located in the Huzur tehsil and the Phanda block. Bhadbhadaghat is the nearest railway station.

Amoni is located close to a forest area, which is home to animals such as tigers and bears.

Demographics 

According to the 2011 census of India, Amoni has 219 households. The effective literacy rate (i.e. the literacy rate of population excluding children aged 6 and above) is 66.21%.

References 

Villages in Huzur tehsil